Sir Charles Lennard Chute, 1st Baronet MC (6 May 1879 – 29 September 1956), was an English barrister, landowner, farmer, politician, and baronet.

Life
Chute was the son of Chaloner William Chute, a barrister. He was educated at Eton, where in 1898 he was Captain of the School, and at Magdalen College, Oxford, then qualified as a barrister at the Inner Temple. In August 1912, at Radley, he married Laura Joan Baker, the daughter of the late Robert Lowbridge Baker, Vicar of Ramsden.

Serving in the British Army during the First World War, Chute rose from staff captain to brigade major of 164 Infantry Brigade and in 1919 was awarded the Military Cross. The citation stated that the decoration was awarded “for great gallantry and devotion to duty as Brigade Major at the Bac de Wavrin on 16th October, 1918.

In 1924, Chute gave the advowson of the parish of Great Moulton, Norfolk, to Bertram Pollock, Bishop of Norwich, and his successors. In 1931, he remained patron of the parish of Sherborne St John.

In February 1925, Chute stated his occupation as farmer and his address as Popley Fields, Basingstoke, in travelling with his wife by a Dutch steamer from Algiers to Southampton. In the same year, he was first elected to Hampshire County Council and served as its chairman from 1938 to 1955. In May 1939, he was appointed as Chairman of the Quarter Sessions for Hampshire. In July 1952, in the 1952 Birthday Honours, a baronetcy, of The Vyne in the County of Southampton, was created for him, for public services in Hampshire. As he had no sons, it became extinct on his death four years later.

Chute died on 29 September 1956<ref name=who>“Chute, Sir Charles (Lennard), (1879–29 Sept. 1956), Barrister-at-law, Inner Temple”, Who’s Who''', online edition, accessed 4 June 2022 </ref> at the Chest Hospital in Southampton, leaving an estate valued at £208,789, with his brother, the Ven. John Chaloner Chute, Archdeacon of Sherborne, as his Executor. He bequeathed The Vyne, his family home and estate, to the National Trust. At his death he still owned the advowson of Sherborne St John, and in 1957 his Executors gave it to the Bishop of Winchester.

John Chaloner Chute died in 1961, leaving an estate valued at £58,588. His Executor was Anthony Vere Chute, a pedigree pig breeder.

Arms

Chute’s arms were blazoned 

 References 

Further reading
 Francis Chute, The Chutes of the Vyne: An Illustrated History of the Chute family and their 300 year connection with stately home The Vyne at Basingstoke in Hampshire'' (Woodfield Publishing, 2005) 

1879 births
1956 deaths
Alumni of Magdalen College, Oxford
English landowners
Chute family
Baronets in the Baronetage of the United Kingdom
People from Sherborne St John
People educated at Eton College
English barristers